Glenea chujoi is a species of beetle in the family Cerambycidae. It was described by Mitono in 1937.

References

chujoi
Beetles described in 1937